Lawrence Billy Jones III (born December 10, 1992) is an American libertarian political commentator, Fox News contributor, talk radio host, and author. He came to prominence in 2015 for raising money for a pizza shop that refused to cater a gay wedding. He is the host of Lawrence Jones Cross Country on Fox News.

Early life
Jones was raised by his mother, Tameria and father, Lawrence Jones II. Jones has stated that he served as "youth mayor" of Garland, Texas in 2009. He graduated from Garland High School in 2011.
Thereafter, Jones studied political science and criminal justice at the University of North Texas.

Career 
Jones was hired as student advocate in the Garland Independent School District, becoming their youngest employee. When he was 19, he ran for a seat on the school board for this district, but lost the election. He served two years as a board member for Dallas County Child Welfare. In 2012, Jones was on the Garland Parks and Recreation Board.
In 2013, he was named Activist of the Year by FreedomWorks. That year, he was asked by Project Veritas, a conservative organization founded by James O'Keefe known for publishing videos for the purpose of exposing allegations of fraud among vendors who enrolled individuals in the healthcare marketplace of the Patient Protection and Affordable Care Act.

In April 2015, Jones created a fundraiser for Memories Pizza, a pizza shop in Indiana that closed after receiving backlash when its owners said they would refuse to cater a gay wedding if asked. The fundraiser raised $844,000 for the family, which was used in part for bills and partly donated to charity and the owner's church.

He hosts The Lawrence Jones Show on TheBlaze Radio Network. He was previously a contributor to conservative television show Dana, hosted by Dana Loesch on Blaze Media.

In February 2018, he became editor-in-chief of the conservative website Campus Reform.

Jones considers himself to be Libertarian.

Fox News 
In May 2018, Jones claimed on Fox News that, because ESPN personality Jemele Hill was unemployed, she therefore did not deserve a journalism award from the National Association of Black Journalists, and that the NABJ was seeking to "applaud unemployment."

In April 2019, Jones wore a small bulletproof vest during a Fox News segment where he was at the U.S.-Mexico border in Laredo, Texas. He was subsequently mocked online, and a number of journalists who routinely cover the border region said they have never used protective gear in the course of the reporting. In his next appearance on Fox News, Jones wore a larger vest and said that the U.S. Border Patrol had told him to wear a bulletproof vest for his safety.

In July 2019, Jones blamed the Barack Obama Administration for a lenient plea deal that sex offender and accused child sex trafficker Jeffrey Epstein received in 2008, incorrectly asserting that Obama was president at the time.

In October 2019, Jones relocated to New York City after it was announced that he had been promoted to a regular substitute host and co-host role at Fox News. In 2022, he began hosting Lawrence Jones Cross Country on the network, in the former time slot of Justice with Judge Jeanine.

See also
 Black conservatism in the United States

References

External links
 

Living people
1992 births
American talk radio hosts
American television hosts
American libertarians
African-American journalists
Black conservatism in the United States
Blaze Media people
People from Dallas
University of North Texas alumni
Fox News people
21st-century American journalists
Journalists from Dallas
Conservatism in the United States
21st-century African-American people